The 2018 Sultan of Johor Cup was the eighth edition of the Sultan of Johor Cup, an international men's under–21 field hockey tournament in Malaysia. It was held in Johor Bahru, Malaysia from 6 to 13 October 2018.

As in previous editions, a total of six teams competed for the title. The United States who competed in 2017 were absent from the tournament. The team was replaced by New Zealand.

Participating nations
Including the host nation, 6 teams competed in the tournament.

 (host nation)

Umpires
A total of eight umpires were appointed by the FIH and National Association to officiate the tournament.

 Harry Collinson (GBR)
 Michael Dutrieux (BEL)
 Aaron Gotting (AUS)
 Erskine Lee (NZL)
 Saifulnizam Mohamad Seftu (SGP)
 Norhisham Shaari (MAS)
 Gurbaj Singh (IND)
 Kenta Uziie (JPN)

Results
All times are in Malaysia Standard Time (UTC+08:00).

Pool matches

Classification matches

Fifth and sixth place

Third and fourth place

Final

Final ranking

References

External links
Official website 

Sultan of Johor Cup
Sultan of Johor Cup
Sultan of Johor Cup
Sultan of Johor Cup